Adrienne French (born 1987) is a fine art photographer specialising in urban landscape. She is the granddaughter of the artist Ray H. French.

Education
Born in Akron, Ohio, French attended Ohio Wesleyan University in Delaware, Ohio. While at Ohio Wesleyan University, French was one of the only freshmen in the photography program, where she studied traditional wet darkroom methods. After her freshman year, she transferred to Ringling College of Art and Design in Sarasota, Florida, where she learned digital photography technology, digital media and printing.

Exhibitions

French has exhibited in group shows around the country. In 2011, her "Abstractions" exhibition at the  Halcyon Art Gallery in Terre Haute, Indiana, featured an array of her black-and-white and color photography.  In 2013, the Kenneth Paul Lesko Gallery in Cleveland, Ohio exhibited her "Chronos Chrysalis" portfolio, characterized by abstract photographs that invite the viewer to see the beauty in the often overlooked urban environment.

Collections

French's work is in private and public collections, including the Midwest Museum of American Art in Elkhart, Indiana.

References

External links 
Official Website

1987 births
Living people
American photographers
American women photographers
Ohio Wesleyan University alumni
Artists from Akron, Ohio
Fine art photographers
21st-century American women